The  Jewelers of America (JA) is a trade association of professionals in the United States jewelry industry. The organization was formed in 1906. Jewelers of America produces a Code of Professional Practices for use by those in the industry. The association also provides information to help consumers learn about jewelry.

In 2009, the Jewelers of America formed a strategic alliance with Jewelers Mutual Insurance Company to enhance services to the industry.

National Jeweler
In January 2015, Jewelers of America acquired National Jeweler from Emerald Expositions. National Jeweler magazine was founded in 1906.

References

External links

1906 establishments in the United States
Jewellery organizations
Jewelry industry in the United States
Organizations established in 1906
Trade associations based in the United States